Lee Cornes is an English television actor and writer born in Worcester.

A stand up comedian since 1980, he was a regular compere at London's Comedy Store throughout the 1980s and won best Stand Up Comedian at the Charrington London Fringe Awards in 1987.

Cornes appeared in three series of Blackadder, in two episodes of The Young Ones and as barman 'Dick Head' in the TV show Bottom. He made an appearance in the first episode of Filthy, Rich & Catflap as a binman. Appeared in the Comic Strip episode "Slags". Appearances on Saturday Night Live. Cornes also starred in children's drama Grange Hill as Mr. Jeff Hankin (1990–2002); provided voices for characters in the children's television series TUGS, and featured in the Doctor Who story "Kinda" as the Trickster (1982). He appeared in Red Dwarf as Paranoia in the series one episode "Confidence and Paranoia". He also appeared several times in the BBC Scotland sitcom Rab C. Nesbitt, once as a DSS Clerk and again as a barman in a Highland pub.

He played a major role as the harassed talent agent Dickie Valentino in the 1994 partially-improvised comedy film There's No Business..., alongside comedy duos Raw Sex (Simon Brint and Rowland Rivron) and The Oblivion Boys (Stephen Frost and Mark Arden).

He appeared in the 2002 S Club Juniors video "One Step Closer." In November 2010 he appeared as Dave in Episode 6 of E4 comedy Phoneshop. He appeared as the Tooting Flasher in Matt Berry's Toast of London pilot. Appeared in Hustle. Also appearances in French and Saunders, The Lenny Henry Show, The Detectives, After You've Gone, and My Family.

Stage appearances include Ken Campbell's The Warp at the Liverpool Everyman, several roles at the Orange Tree Theatre, Richmond. Figaro at The Watford Palace Theatre, as well as pantomime roles. Co-writer and performer The WOW Show at the Wyndham's Theatre. He toured Britain with Neal from the Young Ones.

Cornes was one of the lead writers for Mr Bean, The Animated Series, and a writer on Cavegirl and Channel 4's Gophers!. He was a co-writer of Channel 4's animation series The Bird, and writer/storyliner on What's Up Doc?, a writer and performer on Thames TV's After Hours and joint writer on two series of The WOW Show on Radio 4. He has appeared in various children's television shows such as My Parents are Aliens, Bear Behaving Badly, Jackanory.

In a 2010 interview in The Times, Cornes was cited as one of fellow comedian Sean Lock's biggest comedic influences.  Lock said: "He’s not very well known but he is my main influence — he used to compere at the Comedy Store. He’s the comedians’ comedian. He used to be very unpredictable, which is a great skill in a comedian, not knowing where to go next. He also used to play the physics teacher in Grange Hill."

References
Citations

Sources

External links
 

20th-century English male actors
21st-century English male actors
Living people
English male television actors
People from Hayes, Hillingdon
Male actors from London
Actors from Worcester, England
Male actors from Worcestershire
Year of birth missing (living people)